The Judicial Service Commission (JSC) of Kenya is an independent Commission established under Article 171 of the Constitution of Kenya. Its mandate as stipulated in Article 172 of the Constitution is to promote and facilitate the independence and accountability of the Judiciary and the efficient, effective and transparent administration of justice. The commission has 11 members with the initial team appointed in December 2010.

Role
The Key functions of the JSC are:
 Recommend individuals to the President for appointment as judges
 Review and recommend the conditions of service of judges and judicial officers, other than their remuneration and the staff of the Judiciary
 Appoint, receive complaints against, investigate and remove from office or otherwise discipline registrars, magistrates, other judicial officers and other staff of the Judiciary, in the manner prescribed by an Act of Parliament
 Prepare and implement programmes for the continuing education and training of judges and judicial officers
 Advise the national government on improving the efficiency of the administration of justice.

Composition 
Under Article Article 171(1) of the Constitution of Kenya, the Judicial Service Commission consists of the following 11 members:

 The Chief Justice, who shall be the chairperson of the Commission;
 One Supreme Court judge elected by the judges of the Supreme Court;
 One Court of Appeal judge elected by the judges of the Court of Appeal;
 One High Court judge and one magistrate, one a woman and one a man, elected by the members of the association of judges and magistrates;
 The Attorney-General;
 Two advocates, one a woman and one a man, each of whom has at least fifteen years’ experience, elected by the members of the statutory body responsible for the professional regulation of advocates;
 One person nominated by the Public Service Commission;
 One woman and one man to represent the public, not being lawyers, appointed by the President with the approval of the National Assembly.
The Chief Registrar of the Judiciary serves as the Secretary to the JSC.

Members

Current
The current membership of the JSC is as follows:

 Hon. Lady Justice Martha Koome, Chief Justice & President of the Supreme Court of Kenya - Chairperson of the Commission
Justice Mohammed Khadhar Ibrahim - Judge of the Supreme Court of Kenya - Elected by, and representing Judges of the Supreme Court
 Justice Mohamed Warsame, Judge Court of Appeal of Kenya - Elected by, and representing Judges of the Court of Appeal
 Justice David Majanja, Judge of the High Court of Kenya - Elected by, and representing Judges of the High Court
 Hon Justin Muturi, Attorney General of the Republic of Kenya - Ex Officio
 Mr. Patrick Gichohi - Representing Public Service Commission
 Hon. Everlyne Olwande, Chief Magistrate - Elected by, and representing Magistrates
 Mr. Macharia Njeru, Advocate of the High Court of Kenya - Elected by, and representing the Law Society of Kenya
 Ms Jacqueline Ingutiah, Advocate of the High Court of Kenya - Elected by, and representing the Law Society of Kenya
 Prof. Olive Mugenda - Nominated by the President, representing members of the public
Hon. Anne Amadi, Chief Registrar of the Judiciary serves as the Secretary to the Commission.

Past 
 Mr. Felix Koskei - Nominated by the President, representing members of the public
 Justice Rtd. Paul Kihara Kariuki, Attorney General of the Republic of Kenya
 Justice Philomena Mwilu, Deputy Chief Justice, Judge of the Supreme Court of Kenya - served in the JSC from May 2017 to May 2022 as the representative of Judges of the Supreme Court
 Dr. Mercy Mwara Deche, Advocate of the High Court of Kenya - Elected by, and representing the Law Society of Kenya, served as Vice Chair of the Commission from 2018 to March 2021
Justice David Maraga, Retired Chief Justice / President of the Supreme Court of Kenya, served as Chair of the Commission between 2016 and January 2021
 Justice Willy Mutunga, Retired Chief Justice / President of the Supreme Court of Kenya, served as Chair of the Commission between 2011 and 2016
 Justice Smokin Wanjala - served as representative of Supreme Court Judges
 Justice Isaac Lenaola, currently Associate Justice of the Supreme Court, served in the JSC from 2010 - 2013 as the representative of High Court Judges
 Justice Aggrey Muchelule - served as representative of High Court Judges
 Prof. Githu Muigai - served during his tenure as Attorney General
 Hon. Emily Ominde - served from 2010 - 2020 as the representative of Magistrates
 Florence Mwangangi, Advocate of the High Court of Kenya, served as representative of the Law Society of Kenya
 Prof. Tom Ojienda, Senior Counsel, served as representative of the Law Society of Kenya
 Prof. Margaret Kobia, PhD, Commissioner, served as representative of the Public Service Commission
Kipng’etich arap Korir Bett - served as presidential nominee

Events

Justice interviews
The first high profile actions carried out by the newly appointed JSC were public interviews for the Chief Justice and Deputy Chief Justice positions in May 2011. The Commission nominated lawyers Willy Munyoki Mutunga and Nancy Baraza for the positions of Kenya's Chief Justice and Deputy Chief Justice respectively. The names were forwarded to President Mwai Kibaki, who then submitted them to Parliament after consultation with the Prime Minister Raila Odinga where they were approved.

The Judicial Service Commission, interviewed 25 applicants and in June 2011 nominated 5 Justices to the Supreme Court of Kenya.

Baraza-Kerubo Village Market incident

In January 2012, the Judicial Service Commission formed a sub-committee to investigate reports that Deputy Chief Justice Nancy Baraza assaulted a security guard at the Village Market shopping mall on 31 December 2011. The JSC subsequently recommended her suspension to President Mwai Kibaki and requested the President to appoint a tribunal to investigate her conduct in line with Article 168 (4) of the Constitution. After her suspension, a commission formed to investigate her conduct recommended her removal from office. On 18 October, she subsequently resigned after withdrawing her supreme court appeal of the tribunal's verdict.

2012–2013 Deputy Chief Justice recruitment
The vacant position of Deputy Chief Justice was advertised by the Commission (JSC) on 9 November 2012. The JSC however re-advertised because it was dissatisfied by the number of applicants. The position subsequently attracted applications from 17 women and one man. Those shortlisted for the position were:
 Court of Appeal Judge Kalpana Rawal
 Raychelle Omamo Awuor – first woman chair of the Law Society of Kenya and Kenya ambassador to France
 Joyce Miguda Majiwa – former executive director of FIDA
 Lucy Muthoni Kambuni  – former Law Society of Kenya vice-chairperson
 Okawa Phoebe Nyawade – an advocate of the High Court in private practice

The justices who failed to make the short-list were Roselyn Nambuye, Fatuma Sichale, Fatuma Sichale, Wanjiru Karanja, Grace Wangui Ngenye, Ruth Sitati, Helen Omondi, Hannah Okwengu and Mary Ang'awa.
On 22 February 2013, the JSC announced that after completing the interviews it had nominated Court of Appeal Judge Kalpana Rawal. There will however be a longer wait for the next steps in the process as the current parliament completed its term and the next Parliament is to be elected during the March general Election. The new parliament will then form departmental committees including the one on Justice and Legal Affairs which will then vet her suitability for the office.

References

External links
 
 

Politics of Kenya
Government agencies of Kenya
2012 in Kenya
Judiciary of Kenya
Kenya articles by importance